Anne Savage (born 18 July 1969) is a British hard dance DJ.

Early life
Savage was born in Burnley, Lancashire, England, and raised in the Ribble Valley. She attended the private Westholme School. She took classical guitar lessons at an early age. In the late 1980s, she played guitar in a punk band called 53rd State.

Career
Savage had her first UK DJ residency at Angels in Burnley and later resident at the infamous Vague Club, Leeds. She was also part of the original Tidy Girls line-up, with Lisa Lashes, Lisa Pin-Up, and Rachel Auburn. She has featured several times in DJ Magazine's 'World's Top 100 DJs' and was the only female listed in the 'Top 10 Club DJs in Britain' by the Independent on Sunday. She made regular DJ appearances for club events such as Tidy, Slinky, Frenzy, and Storm.

Her production of "Hellraiser" peaked at No. 74 in the UK Singles Chart in April 2003.

Non-music career

Promoting
In 2013, Anne Savage joined on with Ultra DJ management where she managed the bookings and promoting of various DJs.
Savage joined on with event host and promoter "WeLoveHardHouse" who host venues throughout the UK.

Television
Savage was brought on for an episode of Channel 4's "Faking It" where she attempted to coach a classic musician to become a DJ. The episode ended up winning a BAFTA in 2002 for best production team.

References

External links 
Anne Savage discography at Discogs.com Complete discography
BBC Radio 1 Essential Mix homepage BBC Radio 1 Essential Mix homepage
TranceSound interview, January 2011
Frenzy Gallery with Photos of Anne Savage

Club DJs
English women DJs
People from Ribble Valley (district)
People from Burnley
Living people
1969 births
People educated at Westholme School
Electronic dance music DJs